John Ironmonger (born 16 February 1961) is a former Australian rules footballer who played with the Sydney Swans and Fitzroy in the VFL/AFL.

Ironmonger was a 200 cm ruckman and started his football career at East Perth in the WAFL. He made his debut in 1980 and won a Sandover Medal for his efforts in the 1983 season. The following year he was recruited by Sydney with whom he spent three seasons before joining Fitzroy. Injuries restricted his appearances for Fitzroy but he managed 43 games to bring his league tally to 88 games. He also represented West Australia at interstate football on four occasions during his career and New South Wales on one occasion. In 1992 he was recruited by Victorian Football Association club Werribee.

Ironmonger now lives in Colorado, U.S.A. While living in California, U.S.A. he helped found the Santa Cruz Roos in the late 1990s. He is still involved in Australian Football with the Golden Gate Australian Football League.

References

External links

Golden Gate Australian Football League

1961 births
Living people
Sydney Swans players
Fitzroy Football Club players
East Perth Football Club players
Werribee Football Club players
Sandover Medal winners
Western Australian State of Origin players
Australian rules footballers from Western Australia
New South Wales Australian rules football State of Origin players